Linker or linkers may refer to:

Computing 
 Linker (computing), a computer program that takes one or more object files generated by a compiler or generated by an assembler and links them with libraries, generating an executable program or shared library
 GNU linker, the classic GNU Project's implementation of the Unix linker command ld
 Dynamic linker, the part of an operating system that loads and links the shared libraries for an executable program at run time

People 
 Amy Linker (born 1966), American actress
 Zita Linker (1917–2009), Israeli politician
 Eduard Linkers (1912–2004), an Austrian actor

Biology 
 Linker DNA, the part of a genomic DNA strand that connects two nucleosomes
 Polylinker or multiple cloning site, a short segment of DNA with many restriction sites
 Signal transducing adaptor protein, proteins that provide mechanisms by which receptors can amplify and regulate downstream effector proteins
 Linker of activated T cells, a protein in the biochemical signaling path transferring signals from T cell antigen receptors
 B-cell linker, a human gene that encodes a linker protein related to B cells
 Linker peptide, a flexible part of a peptide between relatively rigid structural domains.

Other uses 
 Inflation-indexed bond or linker, bonds for which the principal is indexed to inflation

See also 
 Link (disambiguation)